Whispering Tongues is a 1934 British crime film directed by George Pearson and starring Reginald Tate, Jane Welsh and Russell Thorndike. The screenplay concerns a son who seeks revenge by stealing valuables from the men who drove his father to suicide.

Cast
 Reginald Tate as Alan Norton 
 Jane Welsh as Claudia Mayland 
 Russell Thorndike as Fenwick 
 Malcolm Keen as Inspector Dawley 
 Felix Aylmer as Supt. Fulton 
 Charles Carson as Roger Mayland 
 Toni Edgar-Bruce as Lady Weaver 
 Victor Stanley as Steward

Production
The film was made at Julius Hagen's Twickenham Studios as a quota quickie for release by RKO Pictures. The film's sets were designed by James A. Carter.

References

Bibliography
Chibnall, Steve. Quota Quickies: The Birth of the British 'B' Film. British Film Institute, 2007.
Low, Rachael. Filmmaking in 1930s Britain. George Allen & Unwin, 1985.
Wood, Linda. British Films, 1927–1939. British Film Institute, 1986.

External links
 

1934 films
1934 crime films
1930s English-language films
British crime films
Films shot at Twickenham Film Studios
Films directed by George Pearson
British black-and-white films
1930s British films